Vanessa Show (born 1950 in La Banda, Argentina) is a travesti performer. As the first travesti in Argentine showbusiness, she is considered a pioneering figure.

Early life
Vanessa Show was born José Mussi in La Banda, a town in Santiago del Estero Province, into an affluent family of cattlemen and slaughterers of Arab origin. When she was twelve, her parents separated and his father disinherited her mother, leaving them penniless. Show moved to Buenos Aires at age fifteen and got low-paying jobs like washing glasses and peeling potatoes at bars.

Career
Show began working as a revue backup dancer for important vedettes such as Nelida Lobato, Nélida Roca, Susana Brunetti and Moria Casán. She eventually got a job at the El Nacional and Maipo theaters. For a while, she alternated this theatre work with appearances as a vedette in a Bahía Blanca cabaret, eventually choosing to dedicate herself entirely to cross-dressing performing. She told Página/12 in 2018: "I stopped being a male dancer in November 1970 and by May 1971 I was already famous as Vanessa Show." She then dedicated herself to doing shows in small theatres from Buenos Aires and other parts of the country, with titles such as Las vedettes son ellos, Compañía de travestis and Los travestis se divierten. In these shows, she initially appeared dressed in men's clothes, gave a monologue and presented other artists, later appearing as a vedette performing musical numbers, with sophisticated costumes with feathers and glitter. The name Vanessa was given to her by producer Éber Lobato, and the surname Show came after a journalist from Crónica described her as "quite a show" upon seeing her.

In 1974, she was the subject of the short documentary film Vanessa directed by Marie Louise Alemann, which documents the performer backstage as she transforms from master of ceremonies to showgirl. Unreleased for many years, the film was rescued by Federico Windhausen through the Archivo de la Memoria Trans and was screened in 2018 at Asterico, an Argentine LGBT film festival.

In 1975, Show was hired to perform in a cabaret in Italy. While in Europe, she began to definitively intervene her body and live her everyday life with a femenine gender expression. Back in Buenos Aires, she bought an apartment in Congreso, but due to constant harassment from the police and the Triple A—which labelled her a "sex terrorist"—decided to return to Europe.

The entertainer continued to perform through several European countries.

Vanessa was consistently acting in the French music halls in Paris, France, at the Carrousel de Paris and Madame Arthur in addition to an extended tour for cities of Italy, Switzerland, Germany and Spain. Vanessa was also the main attraction of private presentations at parties of the King of Morocco.

In the 90s Vanessa returned to her homeland and currently she resides in Buenos Aires. She is steadily invited to be guest of the talk shows of the Argentinian television, and presentations in music halls and magazines interviews. Vanessa is widely known for " no tener pelos en la lengua", a Spanish expression that means "being a blunt person", that only intend to speak very frankly about everything. Her frankly open opinion about the romance that the football player Diego Maradona was having with famed Argentine transsexual Cris Miró was published in article of Rating Cero.

Presentations

References

External links
Vanessa Show Links
Facebook

Living people
1950 births
People from La Banda
Argentine television personalities
Women television personalities
Argentine people of British descent
Argentine expatriates in France
Transgender artists
Transgender women
Argentine transgender people
Argentine LGBT actors
Actresses from Buenos Aires
Argentine people of Spanish descent
Argentine film actresses
Argentine television talk show hosts
Argentine vedettes
Argentine musical theatre actresses
Argentine musical theatre female dancers
Argentine musical theatre women singers
Female impersonators
Travestis